La Cité du Fleuve is a planned neighborhood on the outskirts of Kinshasa Democratic Republic of the Congo, being constructed on land reclaimed from the Congo River. La Cité du Fleuve began as a dream in early 2008. In June 2009 the reclamation and construction work began. Today, land is being reclaimed in preparation for a showhouse, which will be built while land for the rest of Phase 1 is being reclaimed.

A planned development situated on reclaimed land space in the sandbanks and marshes of the Congo river, directly adjacent to Kinshasa in the Democratic Republic of Congo (DRC), the development will be linked to the main land by roads leading to the city and to the airport. 
Upon completion, the new island which is still under development is anticipating at least 250,000 residents.

As of November 2015 this project is only 20% completed, and 35 380 had to be subdivided, for an investment that already exceeds US$100 million. Due to the site location and attractive apartment flagship conditions of acquisition, the project is very advanced. 
To make this project accessible to the Congolese middle class, French-Lebanese businessman Robert Choudury will shortly be opening a bank on the island. The real estate bank of the river will be the first bank in Congo to issue loans to people wishing to purchase a home on credit. At least 40 buildings more than 10 story high are currently under construction in the city center. The city will also have an independent source of energy generated specifically for the city.

References

External links
 

Communities on the Congo River
Populated places in Kinshasa

de:Cité du Fleuve